Steven Christopher Jones (born June 23, 1958, in Suffolk, Virginia) is a former Republican politician from the Commonwealth of Virginia. He was elected to the Virginia House of Delegates in November 1997. He represented the 76th district, made up of parts of the cities of Suffolk and Chesapeake. From 2014 until 2019, he chaired the House Appropriations Committee. One of the chief architects of the 2011 redistricting plan that the US Supreme Court ruled in 2019 was unconstitutionally gerrymandered, he lost re-election in November 2019 after his district was redrawn.

Notes

References

 (Constituent/campaign website)

External links

1958 births
Living people
Republican Party members of the Virginia House of Delegates
Randolph–Macon College alumni
Medical College of Virginia alumni
Politicians from Suffolk, Virginia
Pharmacists from Virginia
21st-century American politicians